Sassolite is a borate mineral, specifically the mineral form of boric acid. It is usually white to gray, and colourless in transmitted light.  It can also take on a yellow colour from sulfur impurities, or brown from iron oxides.

History and occurrence

Its mineral form was first described in 1800, and was named after Sasso Pisano, Castelnuovo Val di Cecina, Pisa Province, Tuscany, Italy where it was found. The mineral may be found in lagoons throughout Tuscany and Sasso. It is also found in the Lipari Islands and the US state of Nevada.  It occurs in volcanic fumaroles and hot springs, deposited from steam, as well as in bedded sedimentary evaporite deposits.

See also

 List of minerals
 Borax

References

External links

Borate minerals
Triclinic minerals
Luminescent minerals
Minerals in space group 2